Daw Mya Thwin, known as Mother Sayamagyi (12 March 1925 – 28 January 2017) was a Theravada Buddhist meditation teacher who has established centres for vipassana meditation around the world. She was a senior disciple of Sayagyi U Ba Khin, a vipassana master, and fulfilled his aspiration to teach Buddhist meditation in the West.

Life and works
Mya Thwin was born on 12 March 1925 in Moulmein, British Burma. She grew up with her grand parents as her mother died in child birth. Through her marriage to U Chit Tin she came into contact with Sayagyi U Ba Khin when her husband was transferred to the Accountant General's Office in Rangoon. Mya Thwin took her first course in 1953 at the International Meditation Centre (IMC) founded by Sayagyi U Ba Khin to teach meditation to his office staff.  As her progress was very rapid, Sayagyi U Ba Khin visited her and her husband every day after the course and continued to teach her. In May of the same year, in a second 10-day course, she completed her training. Sayagyi U Ba Khin then invited the Venerable Webu Sayadaw to the IMC to confirm or correct his teaching. The Webu Sayadaw expressed his approval of Mya Thwin's penetration of the Buddha Dhamma by saying Sadhu three times after meeting her.

After this Mya Thwin was always with Sayagyi U Ba Khin when he taught students, both foreigners and Burmese. She became Sayagyi U Ba Khin's foremost disciple and co-teacher at the IMC. When the first president of independent Burma Sao Shwe Thaik came to the IMC, she helped him greatly in his progress. He told Sayagyi U Ba Khin: “Ma Mya Thwin is not an ordinary disciple”, and he started to address her with the title "Sayama" (Lady teacher) and would pay respects to her before and after he meditated, a very unusual thing to do for such a senior person towards a young lady. Sayagyi U Ba Khin approved of this and also started addressing her as "Sayama". Later the deputy prime minister U Lun Baw, also a devoted meditation student of the IMC, addressed her as “Mother” though she was much younger than him. Later her students addressed her as "Mother Sayamagyi".

After Sayagyi U Ba Khin's death in 1971, Mya Thwin was requested by the president of the Vipassana Association of the Accountant General's Office, U Tint Yee, to take over the responsibility for the centre. She agreed and continued to teach there with the help of her husband U Chit Tin. On request of foreign students who came in increasing numbers, she agreed to travel abroad to teach Vipassana meditation. She and her husband left Burma in October 1978 to fulfill their teacher Sayagyi U Ba Khin's aspiration to make the teachings of the Buddha available in the West. Travelling and teaching for over 30 years Mya Thwin established centres throughout the world including five centres with pagodas for meditation: United Kingdom in 1979, Western Australia in 1981, United States (Maryland) in 1988, New South Wales (near Sydney) in 1989, and Austria (in Karinthia) in 1990. All the centres outside Myanmar have regional teachers who were authorized by Mother Sayamagyi to conduct meditation courses. All the five centres have Dhamma Yaungchi Pagodas, which are replicas of the pagoda at the IMC Yangon. She taught over 450 ten-day meditation courses for thousands of people during her travels in Asia, Australia, the Americas and Europe She also held over 20 Bhikkhu ordinations for those of her students who wanted to experience the advantages of meditating in robes, the garb of the Buddhas. 

In March 1994, the Burmese government awarded Mya Thwin the title of Mahā-Sadhamma-Jotika Dhaja, the highest religious title that can be given to a lay person for her outstanding achievements in teaching the Buddha-Dhamma outside Myanmar.

She died on Saturday 28 January 2017.

See also
 Sayagyi U Ba Khin
 Webu Sayadaw
 International Meditation Centre

References

Sources

Printed sources

Web-sources

External links
Profile at International Meditation Centre

Burmese Theravada Buddhists
1925 births
2017 deaths
People from Mawlamyine